Good Burger is a 1997 American comedy film directed by Brian Robbins and written by 
Dan Schneider with Kevin Kopelow and Heath Seifert. Starring Kenan Thompson and Kel Mitchell, it is based on the comedy sketch of the same name on the Nickelodeon series All That and was produced by Nickelodeon Movies and Tollin/Robbins Productions. After being filmed from March to April 1997, it was released worldwide on July 25 of the same year by Paramount Pictures.

The film received mixed reviews from critics but was commercially successful, grossing $23.7 million against a budget of $8.5 million. In the years since its release, Good Burger garnered a cult following, particularly among millennials who grew up with the film and the All That television series.

A sequel titled Good Burger 2 is scheduled to be released in 2023 on Paramount+.

Plot
On the first day of summer, slacker high school student Dexter Reed takes his mother's car on a joyride while she is away on a business trip but is unintentionally involved in a car crash with his school teacher, Mr. Wheat. With no driver's license or car insurance, Dexter is in danger of going to jail, but Mr. Wheat agrees to let him pay for the damage in exchange for not calling the police on him. With the damage estimated at $1,900 (which later becomes $2,500), Dexter decides to take a summer job to pay for the expenses. After being fired from the new and soon-to-open Mondo Burger restaurant for clashing with the owner and manager, Kurt Bozwell, he ends up working for Good Burger instead. There, he meets and reluctantly befriends the dimwitted, slightly nutty, and absent-minded cashier Ed alongside its other employees. Initially, neither of them is aware that Ed inadvertently caused Dexter's car crash; Ed had rollerbladed in front of Dexter while making a delivery, causing him to swerve and crash into Mr. Wheat's car. While both are working together, Dexter realizes that Ed caused his car crash, but eventually forgives him.

The survival of the smaller Good Burger is threatened by the grand opening of Mondo Burger, with its newly built burger chain and oversized burgers. However, Dexter discovers that Ed makes his own sauce for lunch and suggests adding it to the burgers, which saves Good Burger by vastly increasing its sales. Dexter exploits Ed's gullibility to extort money from him so that he can pay off his debt sooner. Ed promptly signs a contract that gives Dexter 80% of the bonus he receives for his sauce, and Dexter likewise warns Ed against revealing the sauce recipe to anyone. After failing to entice Ed with a higher hourly wage at Mondo Burger, Kurt, who wants the secret sauce for his restaurant, sends an employee named Roxanne to seduce him into revealing the recipe. However, Ed clumsily injures her repeatedly and she ultimately quits her job.

When a dog rejects a discarded Mondo Burger for a discarded Good Burger, a suspicious Ed and Dexter decide to investigate. They infiltrate Mondo Burger's kitchen in disguise and discover that their burgers are artificially enhanced with Triampathol, an illegal food chemical. Kurt discovers them and has them committed to the Demented Hills Asylum, where his acquaintance Wade works as a hospital employee, to prevent them from sharing their discovery. Afterward, Kurt and his henchmen break into Good Burger, find Ed's secret sauce, and begin tainting it with a synthetic toxin called shark poison. Otis, an elderly employee who was sleeping on the premises, catches them red-handed and attempts to call the police, but Kurt sends him to Demented Hills as well. After Otis informs Ed and Dexter about Kurt's scheme, they escape from Demented Hills and hijack an ice cream truck to head back to Good Burger, arriving just in time to prevent anyone from eating the poisoned sauce.

Ed and Dexter return to Mondo Burger to expose their crimes to the police. While Dexter creates a distraction, Ed tries to take a can of Triampathol but clumsily knocks another one into the meat grinder. Inspired, he pours another into the grinder. As Kurt corners Dexter on the roof, Ed suddenly arrives with an empty can. As Kurt mocks Ed's actions, Ed snidely comments to Dexter that the can was not empty when he found it. Mondo Burger then starts to collapse, as the burgers start exploding due to the excess Triampathol. A large artificial burger falls from the roof and smashes Mr. Wheat's newly-repaired car. In the aftermath, Mondo Burger is shut down and Kurt is arrested for poisoning Good Burger's sauce and for using illegal Triampathol. Ed then explains to Dexter that he purposely did what he did to prevent Kurt from manipulating the legal system and escaping conviction, ironically responding to Dexter's questions by saying, "I'm not stupid." Dexter apologizes to Ed for taking advantage of the latter's salary from the sauce and both reconcile, with Dexter tearing up the contract with Ed and telling him that he gets to keep all the profits from his sauce. They return to Good Burger, where their coworkers hail them as heroes.

Cast

Production
Filming for Good Burger took place in 6 weeks from March 9 to April 21, 1997. Most of its scenes were recorded along Glendora Avenue in West Covina, California, and including at a restaurant currently known as "Peter's El Loco". Across the road of Peter's El Loco, Mondo Burger is now currently known as "West Covina Family Dentistry".

Release
The Action League Now! episode "Rock-a-Big Baby" was released prior to screenings of the film.

Home media
Paramount Home Video released the film on VHS on February 17, 1998, and on DVD on May 27, 2003.

The DVD release lacks any special features. After many years, the film was released on Blu-ray on February 16, 2021. On July 19, 2022, a limited edition Blu-ray steelbook of the film was released to commemorate its 25th anniversary. Like the original DVD and first edition Blu-ray, the 25th anniversary lacks any special features except for the original "Good Burger" sketch from All That.

Reception

Box office
In its opening weekend, the film grossed $7.1 million, finishing #5 at the US box office. It went on to gross $23.7 million worldwide. It was released in the United Kingdom on February 13, 1998, where it only reached #14.

Critical response
Rotten Tomatoes gives the film an approval rating of 33% based on 45 reviews and an average rating of 4.3/10. The consensus reads, "Good Burger might please hardcore fans of the 1990s Nickelodeon TV series that launched leads Kenan and Kel to stardom, but for all others, it will likely prove a comedy that is neither satisfyingly rare nor well done." On Metacritic the film has a score of 41 out of 100 based on 17 critics, indicating "mixed or average reviews".

Lisa Alspector of Chicago Reader wrote, "The perceived notion that kids want their movies fast and furious is barely in evidenced in this 1997 comedy, a laboriously slow suburban adventure in which a teenager's summer of leisure slips through his fingers when he has to get a job—an experience that proves almost life threatening because of the cutthroat competition between two burger joints." Andy Seiler of USA Today gave the film two stars out of four, saying that, "Good Burger is not very well done, but it does have energy."

Leonard Klady of Variety wrote, "The meat of the piece is definitely FDA cinematically approved, and perfect if you like this brand of entertainment with the works." Roger Ebert of the Chicago Sun-Times gave the film two stars out of four, writing "It didn't do much for me, but I am prepared to predict that its target audience will have a good time."

Retrospective reviews well after the initial release have described its continued popularity; Nathan Rabin said that the film "obviously connected with a lot of children at the time of the film's release and holds up surprisingly well 18 years later." Courtney Eckerle said, "The 90s generation will never forget [this deliciously terrible movie]" and Tara Aquino of Mental Floss called it "a silly cult hit that's indelibly a part of Generation Y."

Soundtrack

A soundtrack containing hip hop, R&B, funk and punk rock was released on July 15, 1997 by Capitol Records. It peaked at 101 on the Billboard 200 and 65 on the Top R&B/Hip-Hop Albums. It features the single "All I Want" by 702, which reached number thirty-five on the Billboard Hot 100 chart.

Sequel
Aladdin published a children's novel, Good Burger 2 Go, as a sequel to the film. The book, written by Steve Holland, featured Ed following a short-changed customer around the globe. On September 23, 2015, Kenan Thompson and Kel Mitchell made a "Good Burger" sketch for a reunion on The Tonight Show Starring Jimmy Fallon. On March 5, 2018, Mitchell said there were talks on a Good Burger 2 in the moment. On December 13, 2018, he and Thompson stated they are open for a potential sequel or reboot.

In December 2021, the director of the film and current CEO of Paramount Pictures, Brian Robbins, revealed he want to create an animated series based on Good Burger for the Paramount+ streaming service, and hopes to have Thompson and Mitchell involved at some capacity. Mitchell expressed an interest in reviving Good Burger, due to his youngest son being a fan of the film. In August 2022, shortly after receiving his star on the Hollywood Walk of Fame, Thompson confirmed that he and Mitchell are working on the sequel. During the 74th Primetime Emmy Awards where Thompson served as host, the duo once again hinted the sequel after performing a skit with Kumail Nanjiani. On October 24, 2022, Thompson confirmed that the screenplay was finished, with him and Mitchell teasing the script in a joint Instagram post. During an episode of The Tonight Show Starring Jimmy Fallon on March 17, 2023, Thompson and Mitchell both revealed that the sequel will start production in May 2023, and will be released on Paramount+ later the same year. The original screenwriters, Kevin Kopelow and Heath Seifert, will return as writers and executive producers, and Phil Traill is attached to direct.

Literature
 1997: Joseph Locke: Good Burger: A Novelization, Pocket Books,

References

External links

 
 
 
 

1990s buddy comedy films
1990s teen comedy films
1997 comedy films
1997 films
African-American comedy films
All That
American buddy comedy films
American teen comedy films
American children's comedy films
Fictional restaurants
Films about educators
Films about food and drink
Films based on television series
Films directed by Brian Robbins
Films scored by Stewart Copeland
Films set in California
Films set in psychiatric hospitals
Films set in restaurants
Films set in schools
Films with screenplays by Dan Schneider
Nickelodeon Movies films
Paramount Pictures films
Workplace comedy films
1990s English-language films
1990s American films